Prasinoderma is a genus of green algae in the phylum Prasinodermophyta.

References

External links

Chlorophyta genera
Palmophyllophyceae